= Eberhard Meixner =

Eberhard Meixner (28 September 1909 – 30 March 1988) was a German politician and diplomat. He was one of the key figures the German ministry of defense and foreign affairs.

== Life ==
Meixner was born on 28 September 1909 in Breslau (now Wrocław, Poland). He was of Czech decent and born in Silesia as part of the Austrian Empire. During the times of World War I due to the invasion by Poland, he and his family lost everything and needed to rebuild their life from scratch.

From 1945 until 1949, he was imprisoned in Kursk, Russia, which was one of 260 prison camps of the Soviet Union.

He was praised in West Point, United States, for his initiatives and great peace making during times of the Cold War.

Throughout his career, he received countless awards in recognition of his achievements. Meixner's diplomatic relations between Europe, United States and the Soviet Union were honoured with several awards, of which one was also the Grand Cross of the Order of Merit, the highest honour in Germany.

Meixner died on 30 March 1988 in Bonn.
